Soweto East is a part of major Kibera slum in Nairobi. A school KidStar Academy is in Soweto West. 
Other parts of Kibera include Soweto East, Laini Saba Lindi, Makina, Kianda, Mashimoni, Gatuikira, Kisumu Ndogo and Siranga.

References

Suburbs of Nairobi
Slums in Kenya